The All-Atlantic Hockey Teams are composed of players at all positions from teams that are members of the Atlantic Hockey Association, an NCAA Division I hockey-only conference. Each year, at the conclusion of the Atlantic Hockey regular season, the head coaches of each member team vote for players to be placed on each all-conference team. The First Team, Second Team and Rookie Teams have been named since 2003–04 (the inaugural year of Atlantic Hockey) and a Third Team was added starting in 2006–07.

The all-conference teams are composed of one goaltender, two defencemen and three forwards. Should a tie occur for the final selection at any position, both players will be included as part of the superior team with no reduction in the number of players appearing on any succeeding teams (as happened in 2004–05 and 2008–09). Players may only appear once per year on any of the first, second, or third teams but freshman may appear on both the rookie team and one of the other all-conference teams.

Due to the conference playing in two separate pods (East and West) for the 2020–21 season, as a result of the COVID-19 pandemic, Atlantic Hockey named two all-conference and an all-Rookie team for each pod. No Third team was named.

All-Conference Teams

First Team

2000s

2010s

2020s

First Team All-Stars by school

Multiple Appearances

Second Team

2000s

2010s

2020s

Second Team All-Stars by school

Multiple Appearances

Third Team

2000s

2010s

2020s

Third Team All-Stars by school

Multiple Appearances

Rookie Team

2000s

2010s

2020s

Rookie Team All-Stars by school

See also
Atlantic Hockey Awards
MAAC Awards

References

External links

2003–04 Atlantic Hockey Regular Season Award Winners
2004–05 Atlantic Hockey Regular Season Award Winners
2005–06 Atlantic Hockey Regular Season Award Winners
2006–07 Atlantic Hockey Regular Season Award Winners
2007–08 Atlantic Hockey Regular Season Award Winners
2008–09 Atlantic Hockey Regular Season Award Winners
2009–10 Atlantic Hockey Regular Season Award Winners

2010–11 Atlantic Hockey Regular Season Award Winners
2011–12 Atlantic Hockey Regular Season Award Winners
2012–13 Atlantic Hockey Regular Season Award Winners
Atlantic Hockey First All-Star Team (Incomplete)
Atlantic Hockey Second All-Conference Team (Incomplete)
Atlantic Hockey Third All-Conference Team (Incomplete)

College ice hockey trophies and awards in the United States